Jab Jab Phool Khile is a 1965 Indian Hindi-language romantic drama film. It stars Shashi Kapoor and Nanda. The story is of a poor boy who is a boatman in Kashmir and falls in love with a rich tourist. The film became a "blockbuster" at the box office, was No. 2 in top ten grossing films at Box Office India for 1965. The songs by the music composing duo Kalyanji Anandji, assisted by then little-known Laxmikant Pyarelal are highlights of the film (lyrics by Anand Bakshi). The film was screened in Algeria's cinema halls every two days for a couple of years; there was, in fact, public demand for it. Shashi Kapoor was one of the most successful Indian actors in North African countries such as Algeria, Morocco and Libya. In the souks of Marrakesh, even today some of the older shopkeepers will give you a discount if you are from the land of Shashi Kapoor. In 1996, the Hindi movie Raja Hindustani was inspired by this movie.

Plot
Rita Khanna (Nanda), only daughter and an heiress of Raj Bahadur Chunnilal goes to Kashmir for a holiday along with her maid Stella (Shammi). There, she rents a houseboat and becomes friendly with owner of that houseboat Raja (Shashi Kapoor). Raja was an innocent and romantic village guy who lives along with his younger sister Munni(Baby Farida). After some misunderstandings, they grow friendly and Raja falls in love with Rita. Before starting back, Rita promises Raja that she would come back the following year.

At her home, her father wants her to marry Kishore,(Jatin Khanna) but Rita keeps on postponing her decision. She goes to Kashmir the following year as promised, but Kishore comes along with her, causing Raja trouble. Finally Raja professes his love and asks her to marry him. She chooses Raja over Kishore and brings him to her dad.

Raj Bahadur (Kamal Kapoor) doesn't want his daughter to marry Raja and tries to reason with her, but fails. At last, he tells his daughter that Raja was of a completely different background and can't adjust to their ways. Rita asks Raja to change his appearance and habits and Raja agrees. After a makeover, Raj Bahadur throws a party to introduce Raja to everyone. There, Raja couldn't bear watching Rita dancing with other men. It leads to a quarrel between them and Raja leaves her house saying that he couldn't adjust to her culture.

Rita feels bad that Raja left just because of a minor fight. Then she overhears her father saying that he planned everything to separate them and he knows way before that Raja couldn't tolerate Rita dancing with other men. Rita understands that she unnecessarily fought with Raja and decides to move to Kashmir with him. She goes to the railway station and requests Raja to take her with him. The movie ends with Raja pulling Rita into a moving train and both embrace happily.

Cast
 Shashi Kapoor as Raja / Rajkumar
 Nanda as Rita Khanna
 Kamal Kapoor as Raja Bahadur Chunnilal Khanna
 Shammi as Stella
 Mridula as Mrs. Khanna, Rita's Mother
 Baby Farida as Munni
 Jatin Khanna as Kishore
 Tun Tun as Mary
 Agha as Amarrnath
 Bhalla as Djun Djun
 Prayag Raj
 Shyam as Shyam kumar
 Javed

Soundtrack

Trivia
 According to film and music expert Rajesh Subramanian, it was writer - actor Prayag Raj who sang the refrains "Affoo Khuda" in the song.
 Shashi Kapoor always said that Nanda was his favorite heroine, as she had signed with him when she was the bigger star.
 Director Suraj Prakash, writer Brij Katyal, star Shashi Kapoor and music composers Kalyanji Anandji teamed up again for another film, Sweetheart (1970), co-starring Asha Parekh; it was never released, even though Asha has said that it was a "very sweet film."
 The role of Nanda's suitor was played by Jatin Khanna. Actor Rajesh Khanna had to later change his name to avoid confusion with this actor.
 Brij Katyal's script was turned down by three top producers, including Sholay (1975) creator G.P. Sippy. However, director Suraj Prakash felt it was a beautiful story and accepted it. It went on to become his greatest hit. It was his first colour film.
 To prepare for his role as Raja, Shashi Kapoor would spend days with the boatmen in Kashmir to study their lifestyle. Sometimes, he would have meals with them.
 At the film's Golden Jubilee celebrations, Suraj Prakash asked Brij Katyal what religion Raj belonged to, as it had never been specified and no one had noticed till now. It turned out that all the boatmen in Srinagar were Muslims. The writer was speechless, as this could have been portrayed as a Hindu-Muslim love story. Prakash claims this to be the true climax behind the making of his greatest hit.
 While on location in Srinagar, a Lieutenant Colonel from Maharashtra became smitten with Nanda and asked Suraj Prakash to forward a marriage proposal to her mother. Nothing came of it, however.
 Director Suraj Prakash and actor Shashi Kapoor made a bet: Prakash said the film would run for 25 weeks and Kapoor, eight weeks. Whoever proved to be right would present the other a suit stitched at Burlington's. Prakash won the bet and presented the suit to Kapoor; however, each proved to be wrong, as the film ran for 50 weeks and celebrated its golden jubilee.
 Lyricist Anand Bakshi's career took off after this film.
 The climax, where Raja pulls Rita into the train, was shot in Bombay Central Train Station. Suraj Prakash gave explicit instructions on how and when to pull Nanda into the train. Kapoor followed those directions so well that there were only a few feet left for the platform to end when he pulled her in. Prakash claims the incident was so hair-raising that he'd shut his eyes, convinced that Nanda's end had come.
 The original climax from the script had Raja beating up the bad guys. However, Suraj Prakash rejected it, and after an afternoon watching Love in the Afternoon (1957), he settled with Rita leaving everything behind to go back to Kashmir with Raja.
 Rita (Nanda) is spotted reading Lolita in the houseboat at the time of teaching Hindi to Raja (Shashi Kapoor).

References

External links 
 

1965 films
1960s Hindi-language films
Indian romantic drama films
1965 romantic drama films
Films scored by Kalyanji Anandji
Films set in Jammu and Kashmir